Pylia was one of the provinces of the Messenia Prefecture. Its territory corresponded with that of the current municipality Pylos-Nestor (except for the municipal unit Nestoras) and the municipal units Aipeia, Petalidi and Voufrades. It was abolished in 2006.

References

Provinces of Greece
Messenia